Alessio Lorandi (born 8 September 1998) is an Italian racing driver.

Career

Karting
Lorandi began his racing career in karting in 2007. Lorandi won the Karting Federation Junior championship in 2013. He remained in karting until 2014.

Formula 3
In 2015, Lorandi debuted in open-wheel racing, in European Formula 3 Championship with Van Amersfoort Racing. The following year, he switched to Carlin and claimed his maiden victory at the third race at Pau.

GP3 Series
Lorandi made his debut in the series at the final two rounds of the 2016 season with Jenzer Motorsport. In 2017, he reunited with the team to contest the series full-time.

Formula 2 
In July 2018, Lorandi was called up to be a temporary replacement for Santino Ferrucci at Trident's Formula 2 team, after Ferrucci aggressively crashed into his team-mate Arjun Maini on the cool-down lap at the 2018 Silverstone FIA Formula 2 round. This replacement was set to last for four races. But shortly after the Trident team chose to sack Ferrucci due to unsportsmanlike behaviour, resulting in Lorandi replacing Ferrucci for the remainder of the season.

Personal life
Lorandi's younger brother Leonardo Lorandi is also a racing driver.

Racing record

Career summary

Complete FIA Formula 3 European Championship results
(key) (Races in bold indicate pole position) (Races in italics indicate fastest lap)

Complete GP3 Series results
(key) (Races in bold indicate pole position) (Races in italics indicate fastest lap)

Complete FIA Formula 2 Championship results

References

External links
 

1998 births
Living people
Italian racing drivers
Karting World Championship drivers
FIA Formula 3 European Championship drivers
Italian GP3 Series drivers
FIA Formula 2 Championship drivers
Carlin racing drivers
Van Amersfoort Racing drivers
Jenzer Motorsport drivers
Trident Racing drivers